Clytemnestrinae is a subfamily of copepods belonging to family Peltidiidae in the order Harpacticoida.

Genera:

 Clytemnestra Dana, 1847
 Goniopsyllus Brady, 1883

References

Copepods
Arthropod subfamilies